The first season of Casamento às Cegas: Brasil, also known as Love Is Blind: Brazil, premiered on Netflix on October 6, 2021, as part of a three-week event.

Following the format of the American television series Love Is Blind, a group of men and women meet on the show with the hopes of finding a partner in marriage.

Production

Filming 
Filming began in São Paulo on January 16, 2021, and lasted 39 days up until the weddings. After the five newly engaged couples left the pods, filming took place at the Lake Villas Charm Hotel in Amparo, São Paulo, Brazil, when all the couples went on a retreat. Then, the relationships that made it through the retreat in the countryside move in together in an apartment complex in São Paulo, where they spent the rest of the time filming up until the weddings on March 2021.

Release 
The trailer for the first season was released on September 10, 2021. With the trailer, it was announced that the ten-episode season would be released on a three-week schedule: the first four episodes were released on October 6, 2021, the next four on October 13, and the final two on October 20.

On October 22, 2021, Netflix announced a reunion special available on YouTube on November 4. The reunion was filmed on October 21.

Season summary

Contestants

Unaired engagements 
A total of ten couples got engaged among the contestants. In addition to the five couples shown on the series, another five also got engaged in the show: They were: Aline Magara and Diego Pasquini, Ana Gaudêncio and Alexis Martinho, Anna Arraes and  Bruno Brych, Pamella de Sousa and Gustavo Mester, Priscilla Pitman and Victor Varella.

Future appearances 
In 2022, Shay Haghbin appeared in A Fazenda 14, where he ended up ejected from the game alongside model Tiago Ramos due to violent behaviour towards each other, finishing in 16th–15th place.

Episodes

References 

2021 Brazilian television seasons